Insecure is an American comedy-drama television series created by Issa Rae and Larry Wilmore, and is partially based on Rae's acclaimed web series Awkward Black Girl. The series is about the awkward experiences of a contemporary African-American woman. The series premiered online on September 23, 2016, via HBO Now and HBO Go, before airing weekly on HBO from October 9, 2016.

Insecure received critical acclaim since its debut in 2016. In 2017, the American Film Institute selected it as one of the top 10 television programs of the year. In 2020, the series received eight Primetime Emmy Award nominations for its fourth season, including the Primetime Emmy Award for Outstanding Comedy Series. For her performance on the series, Rae received two Golden Globe Award nominations for Best Actress – Television Series Musical or Comedy, in addition to three Primetime Emmy Award nominations for Outstanding Lead Actress in a Comedy Series (2018, 2020 and 2022). Yvonne Orji received a Primetime Emmy Award nomination for Outstanding Supporting Actress in a Comedy Series in 2020 for her performance in the series.

Insecure ran for five seasons. The series finale aired on December 26, 2021.

Background 
On August 6, 2013, Rae began working on a comedy series pilot with co-creator Larry Wilmore. The show was planned to be about the awkward experiences of a contemporary African-American woman, and the pair eventually settled on the current title of Insecure. HBO picked up the pilot on October 15, 2015, and it was subsequently greenlit for production.

At HBO's 2016 Television Critics Association session, which featured Rae, show runner Prentice Penny, and executive producer Melina Matsoukas, Issa Rae explained that the series will examine "the complexities of 'Blackness' and the reality that you can’t escape being Black." She also mentioned, in regard to the potential mainstream reaction to the series:We’re just trying to convey that people of color are relatable. This is not a hood story. This is about regular people living life.

Raphael Saadiq created original music for the first season. Solange Knowles served as music consultant for the show and was introduced by Matsoukas, who directed the music video for Knowles's song "Losing You".

On November 14, 2016, HBO renewed the show for a second season which premiered on July 23, 2017. On August 8, 2017, HBO renewed the show for a third season, which premiered on August 12, 2018. On September 6, 2018, HBO renewed the series for a fourth season which premiered on April 12, 2020. On May 1, 2020, the series was renewed for a fifth season. On January 13, 2021, HBO announced that the fifth season will be its last. The fifth and final season premiered on October 24, 2021.

Plot 
Within the first season, eight episodes unpacked the story of the Black female experience from the perspective of two female protagonists, Issa (Issa Rae) and Molly (Yvonne Orji), who have been best friends with each other since their college days at Stanford. Both in their late 20s, they navigate career and relationship experiences while living in their hometown of South Los Angeles, California. The two share a close bond, and throughout the show, they deal with internal struggles, their friendship and the African American community. Issa works at a non-profit that benefits middle-school aged students of color called "We Got Y'all". She struggles to reignite the passion in her relationship with her long-term boyfriend, Lawrence (Jay Ellis), who has been slacking in their relationship since his start-up company failed. Molly is a corporate attorney who has career success but difficulty with dating men. The half-hour series explores social and racial issues that relate to the contemporary American experience.

Cast

Main
 Issa Rae as Issa Dee
 Yvonne Orji as Molly Carter
 Jay Ellis as Martin Lawrence Walker
 Lisa Joyce as Frieda (seasons 1–3; guest star, season 5)
 Natasha Rothwell as Kelli Prenny (seasons 2–5; recurring, season 1)
 Amanda Seales as Tiffany DuBois (seasons 2–5; recurring. season 1)
 Y'lan Noel as Daniel King (seasons 2–3; recurring, season 1)
 Alexander Hodge as Andrew Tan (season 4; recurring, season 3)
 Kendrick Sampson as Nathan Campbell (seasons 4–5; recurring, season 3)
 Leonard Robinson as Taurean Jackson  (season 5; recurring, seasons 3–4)
 Courtney Taylor as Sequoia "Quoia" (season 5; recurring, season 4)

Recurring
 Neil Brown Jr. as Chad Kerr
 Catherine Curtin as Joanne (seasons 1–3)
 Mason McCulley as Ken (seasons 1–3)
 Veronica Mannion as Kitty (seasons 1–3)
 Sujata Day as Sarah (seasons 1–3; guest star, season 5)
 Wade Allain-Marcus as Derek DuBois
 Langston Kerman as Jared (seasons 1, 3)
 DomiNque Perry as Tasha (seasons 1–2)
 Kathreen Khavari as Patricia (seasons 1–3)
 Tristen J. Winger as Thug Yoda
 Maya Erskine as Diane Nakamura (seasons 1–2)
 Heather Mazur as Hannah Richards-Foster (seasons 1–2)
 Tiana Le as Dayniece (season 1)
 Denise Dowse as Dr. Rhonda Pine (seasons 2–5)
 Sarunas J. Jackson as Alejandro 'Dro' Peña (seasons 2–3, 5)
 Spencer Garrett as John Merrill (season 2)
 Jean Elie as Ahmal Dee (seasons 2–5)
 Lil Rel Howery as Quentin (season 2)
 Jasmine Kaur as Aparna (season 2)
 Leon Thomas as Eddie (season 2)
 Samantha Cope as Brooke (season 2)
 Don Franklin as Malcolm (season 3)
 Tyrone Evans Clark as a Guest Star (seasons 4-5)
 Christina Elmore as Condola Hayes (seasons 4–5)
 Norman Towns as Bennett (seasons 4–5)
 Kofi Siriboe as Crenshawn (season 5)
 Chinedu Unaka as Omari (seasons 5)

Episodes

Season 1 (2016)

Notes

Season 2 (2017)

Season 3 (2018)

Notes

Season 4 (2020)

Season 5 (2021)

Soundtrack
The soundtrack for the series is overseen by Rae, music supervisor Kier Lehmann and musician Raphael Saadiq.  The soundtrack often uses modern alternative R&B artists.  Compilations of songs used in the show have been released with each season.  Several artists, such as Goldlink, Sampha, and The Internet, have experienced commercial success after being featured on the show.  The success of the lead to Rae establishing her own record label, Raedio, in partnership with Atlantic Records and a publishing deal with Kobalt Music Group.

Reception

Critical response

Season 1
On Rotten Tomatoes, the season has a rating of 100% based on 65 reviews, with an average rating of 8.6/10. The site's critical consensus reads, "Insecure uses star Issa Rae's breakout web series Awkward Black Girl as the basis for an insightful, raunchy, and hilarious journey through the life of a twentysomething black woman that cuts through stereotypes with sharp wit and an effusive spirit." On Metacritic, the season has a score of 84 out of 100, based on 33 reviews, indicating "universal acclaim".

Eric Deggans of NPR wrote that "Rae has produced a series that feels revolutionary just by poking fun at the life of an average, twentysomething black woman." Greg Braxton of the Los Angeles Times wrote: "The half-hour series explores the friendship between two African American women who deal with their sometimes stormy relationship while also grappling with conflicts inside and outside black culture. Much of the humor has a raw flavor, and does not hold back on sexually frank situations and dialogue."

Season 2
On Rotten Tomatoes, season two has an approval rating of 98% based on 41 reviews, with an average rating of 8.11/10. The site's critical consensus reads, "Insecure displays title-defying confidence in its second season, upping the comedy and deepening the relationships between its talented ensemble." On Metacritic, the season has a weighted average score of 90 out of 100, based on 13 critics, indicating "universal acclaim".

Season 3
On Rotten Tomatoes, season three has an approval rating of 94% based on 27 reviews, with an average rating of 7.6/10. The site's critical consensus reads, "Insecure returns for a third season as authentic and exuberant as the star who made it, but with an added layer of growth that keeps it moving forward." On Metacritic, the season has a weighted average score of 84 out of 100, based on 8 critics, indicating "universal acclaim".

Season 4
On Rotten Tomatoes, season four has an approval rating of 95% based on 20 reviews, with an average rating of 8.29/10. The site's critics consensus reads: "Insecure continues to be one of the funniest, warmest, and most beautifully-shot comedies that takes full advantage of its sunny L.A. setting." On Metacritic, the season has a weighted average score of 80 out of 100, based on five critics, indicating "generally favorable reviews".

Season 5
On Rotten Tomatoes, season 5 has an approval rating of 100% based on 25 reviews, with an average rating of 9.3/10. The site's critical consensus states, "Issa's future remains uncertain, but Insecure enters its final season a fully confident comedy with plenty left to say about friendship, love, and self-esteem." On Metacritic, the season has a weighted average score of 80 out of 100, based on 10 critics, indicating "generally favorable reviews".

Accolades

Syndication
The series began airing on Oprah Winfrey Network on February 7, 2023, with two back-to-back episodes.

References

External links

Official series finale screenplay

2010s American black television series
2020s American black television series
2010s American comedy-drama television series
2020s American comedy-drama television series
2016 American television series debuts
2021 American television series endings
English-language television shows
HBO original programming
Television series by Home Box Office
Television series by 3 Arts Entertainment
Television series created by Larry Wilmore
Television shows set in Los Angeles
Television shows filmed in Los Angeles
Hoorae Media